This is a list of Latin American rock musicians.

 ? and the Mysterians, from 1962 to present
 Zayra Alvarez, Puerto Rican singer-songwriter
 Angra, Brazilian heavy metal band
 Aterciopelados, Colombian band 
 Cedric Bixler of The Mars Volta
 Café Tacuba, Mexican alternative band
 Cannibal & the Headhunters, 'Land of a 1,000 Dances' Mexican-American band out of East LA
 Capsula, Argentinian rock n roll band
 Roberto Carlos, Brazilian singer-songwriter
 Contracorriente, Peruvian hardcore punk band
 Crisis, El Salvador rock group beginning of the 1980s
 Cruzados
 Da Lata
 Dolores Delirio, Peruvian alternative post punk band
 Alejandro Escovedo, singer, songwriter
 Los Fabulosos Cadillacs
 Flema, Peruvian punk garage rock band
 Oz Fox (Ricardo Martinez), guitarist, Stryper, Sin Dizzy, Vinyl Tattoo
 Charly Garcia, Argentine singer
 Erica Garcia, Argentine singer-songwriter 
 Ely Guerra, Mexican singer-songwriter
 Cachorro Grande, Brazilian retro 1960s and 1970s rock n roll
 Los Hermanos, Brazilian Latin/alternative rock band
 Ill Niño, alternative metal band
 Jaguares, Mexico
 Los Jaivas, Chilean rock band
 Leusemia, Peruvian punk rock band
 La Ley, Chilean band
 Líbido, Peruvian alternative band
 Los Bunkers, Chilean band
 Los Lobos, band
 Los Lonely Boys, Mexican-American power trio
 Lucybell, Chilean band
 Maldita Vecindad, band
 Malo, Mexican band, including Carlos Santana's brother
 Maná, Mexican band
 Massacration, Brazilian heavy metal band
 Molotov, Mexican Spanglish band
 Os Mutantes, Brazilian 1960s progressive rock
 Ozomatli
 P.O.D, Latino rap/rock band
 Daryl Palumbo of  Glassjaw (American hardcore band)
 Panda or Pxndx, Mexican band
 David Peel
 Chris Pérez
 Pedro Suarez Vertiz, retired Peruvian rock artist , lead singer of Arena Hash
 Pierce The Veil, post-hardcore Latino band from San Diego
 The Plugz
 Los Prisioneros, Chilean classic rock band
 Project46, Brazilian death metal band
 Puya
 Rata Blanca, Argentine power metal/hard rock band
 The ReAktion Chilean alternative Rock, Nu metal
 Redbone The Vegas Brothers formed the Mexican-American/Native American funk rock band, Redbone
 Omar Rodriguez-Lopez of At the Drive-In, The Mars Volta, Bosnian Rainbows (emo-punk, progressive rock)
 Draco Rosa, singer, musician, songwriter
 Domingo Samudio, 'Sam' of Sam the Sham & the Pharaohs. Born in Texas, but of Mexican heritage.
 Carlos Santana, Mexican songwriter, guitarist
 Seguida
 Sepultura, Brazilian thrash metal band
 Soda Stereo, Argentine rock band
 Soulfly, Brazilian alternative metal band
 Lynda Thomas, retired Mexican alternative rock musician of the 1990s and 2000s
 Transmetal, Mexican death metal band
 Ritchie Valens, a pioneer of the Spanish-speaking rock and roll movement
 Andrew Velasquez, lead vocals for post-hardcore band, Crown the Empire
 Julieta Venegas, singer-songwriter
 The Zeros

References 

Latino rock
Rock Musicians
Rock Musicians